The Most Illustrious Order of Sultan Ahmad Shah of Pahang (Malay: Darjah Kebesaran Sultan Ahmad Shah Pahang Yang Amat Di Mulia) is a knighthood order of the Sultanate of Pahang.

History 
The order was founded by Sultan Ahmad Shah on 24 October 1977. It is awarded to individuals who have rendered meritorious service to the State.

Classes 
There are four classes of the order:

 Grand Knight (Sri Sultan Ahmad Shah Pahang, post-nominal letters : SSAP)
 Knight Companion (Darjah Sultan Ahmad Shah Pahang, post-nominal letters : DSAP)
 Companion (Setia Ahmad Shah Pahang, post-nominal letters : SAP)
 Member (Ahli Ahmad Shah Pahang, post-nominal letters : AAP)

Recipients

Grand Knights (S.S.A.P.)

The grand knights receives the title Dato' Sri and his wife Datin Sri

 1977: Mahathir Mohamad 
 1980: Abdullah of Pahang 
 1980: Tengku Razaleigh Hamzah 
 1981: Tengku Ahmad Rithauddeen Ismail
 1981: Harris Salleh
 1985: Najib Razak
 1990: Anwar Ibrahim
 1999: Abdullah Ahmad Badawi
 2002: Zeti Akhtar Aziz
 2003: Norian Mai
 2004: Mohd Bakri Omar
 2008: Ismail Sabri Yaakob
 2009: Ali Hamsa
 2013: Noor Hisham Abdullah
 2014: Noorainee Abdul Rahman
 2015: Tengku Zafrul Aziz
 2016: Acryl Sani Abdullah Sani
 2016: Abdul Ghafar Rajab
 2016: Yap Chen Hiong
 2016: Mohamad Fuzi Harun
 2016: Jalaluddin Abdul Rahman
 2016: Rusli Ahmad
 2016: Tengku Hassanal Ibrahim Alam Shah
 2017: Siti Nurhaliza
 2018: Mohd Zakaria Ahmad
 2020: Tengku Amir Nasser Ibrahim
 2020: Tengku Puteri Iman Afzan
 2020: Abdul Jalil Hassan
 2021: Mohd Shafiq Abdullah

Knight Companion (D.S.A.P.)
The Knight Companions receives the title Dato''' and his wife Datin''

 1986: Mohd Zaman Khan
 1998: Mohd Jamil Johari
 2006: Koh Hong Sun
 2006: Abdul Razak Bokhari
 2007: Muhammad Sabtu Osman
 2009: Sudirman Haji Arshad (posthumously)
 2014: Law Hong Soon
 2014: Fatimah Ghazali
 2016: Sahabudin Abdul Manan
 2017: Mohd Shuhaily Mohd Zain
 2022: Mohd Roslan Sulaiman

See also 
 Orders, decorations, and medals of the Malaysian states and federal territories#Pahang
 Orders, decorations, and medals of Pahang
 List of post-nominal letters (Pahang)

References

External links 

 Colecciones Militares (Antonio Prieto Barrio), 

Orders of chivalry of Malaysia
Orders, decorations, and medals of Pahang